Fuyou Street Merchandise Mart is a market located at 225 Fuyou Lu (福佑路225号) in Shanghai's Huangpu District, in China.

References

External links

 

Huangpu District, Shanghai